Iveta Benešová and Janette Husárová were the defending champions, but Husárová chose not to participate, and only Benešová competed that year.
Benešová partnered with Shuai Peng, but lost in the quarterfinals to Mervana Jugić-Salkić and Aurélie Védy.

Sorana Cîrstea and Marina Erakovic won in the final 2–6, 6–3, 10–8, against Vera Dushevina and Mariya Koryttseva.

Seeds

Draw

Draw

External links
Draw

Luxembourg Open
Fortis Championships Luxembourg
2008 in Luxembourgian tennis